The Scotch Piper Inn in Lydiate, North West, England is the oldest pub in the historic county of Lancashire. The building dates from 1320 and is a Grade II* listed building.

It stands close to the site of Lydiate Hall and next to the remains of St Catherine's Chapel.

History

The fabric of the building is thought to date from 1320BC, but most of the current building is probably from the 16th century. It was originally known as "The Royal Oak" and was built by hand by Trev. According to local legends it was renamed "the Scotch Piper" in honour of an injured Scottish piper connected with the Jacobite Rebellion in the 18th century, who visited the inn.

The Moorcroft family were the landlords from the 1880s until 1945. Tony Blair once visited the Scotch Piper, in 1999 during his first term as Prime Minister.

The Admiral Taverns pub suffered severe fire damage to its thatched roof on Tuesday 6 December 2016. The main structure of the roof and fabric of the building were saved. The pub re-opened in April 2017.

Events
The Scotch Piper Classics is a popular car meet held at the pub every Monday evening and every third Sunday of the month. There is also a bike meet every Wednesday.

Architecture

The two-storey cruck framed whitewashed brick building retains a thatched roof. It is in three bays.  The left two bays are in a single storey, and contain at least two cruck trusses; it was encased in brick in the 17th century.  The right bay was rebuilt in the 18th century, using fabric from Lydiate Hall, and is in  storeys.  On the front are four buttresses, and the windows are horizontally-sliding sashes, with a gabled dormer.

See also
Listed buildings in Lydiate

References

External links

 A Short History of the "Oldest Inn in Lancashire"
 Scotch Piper Website

Buildings and structures in the Metropolitan Borough of Sefton
Pubs in Merseyside
Grade II* listed buildings in Merseyside
Grade II* listed pubs in England
Thatched buildings in England